The Women's Tax Resistance League (WTRL) was from 1909 to 1918 a direct action group associated with the Women's Freedom League that used tax resistance to protest against the disenfranchisement of women during the British women's suffrage movement.

Dora Montefiore proposed the formation of the league in 1897, and it was formally established on 22 October 1909. The league's activities peaked in the years before the First World War but were largely deflated in 1914 by the onset of that war, when the league membership passed a resolution to temporarily suspend their tax resistance.

Members saw themselves in a tradition of British tax resistance that included John Hampden.  According to one source: "Tax resistance proved to be the longest-lived form of militancy, and the most difficult to prosecute. More than 220 women, mostly middle-class, participated in tax resistance between 1906 and 1918, some continuing to resist through the First World War, despite a general suspension of militancy."

Program
League member and author Beatrice Harraden said in 1913:

The least any woman can do is to refuse to pay taxes, especially the tax on actually earned income. This is certainly the most logical phase of the fight for suffrage.  It is a culmination of the Government's injustice and stupidity to ask that we pay an income tax on income earned by brains, when they are refusing to consider us eligible to vote.

The league was formed three years ago with the slogan: "No vote, no tax". It is non-partisan—an association of constitutional and militant suffragists, recruited from various suffrage societies for the purpose of resisting taxes.

Action
In several cases, the government seized and sold at auction items owned by the resisters. The League used these occasions as opportunities for demonstrations and publicity, for instance the "Siege of Montefiore" in 1906:

The house, surrounded by a wall, could be reached only through an arched doorway, which Montefiore and her maid barred against the bailiffs.  For six weeks, Montefiore resisted payment of her taxes, addressing the frequent crowds through the upper windows of the house.

Elizabeth Wilks who was the treasurer of the league refused to pay her tax in 1908. Actually married women were not required to pay tax in Britain at that time. According to the law the joint income of a couple was added together and the husband paid the tax. However Elizabeth who earned more than her husband refused to tell her husband how much she earned. This put the authorities into a quandary as Elizabeth was not liable to pay tax and her husband said he was willing to pay the tax but he said that he had no idea how much to pay. In 1910 the authorities illegally seized some of Elizabeth's goods in an attempt to levy the tax on her income. The authorities then tried to claim the tax either from the Wilks or by her husband alone. This was legally unsatisfactory as Mark was being asked for tax on an income of about £600 per annum that he was nominally unaware of. Then 3,000 teachers signed a petition when Mark Wilks was placed in Brixton prison and there was a demonstration in Trafalgar Square to protest at his treatment. He was released after a fortnight to a celebrations from the supporters of the Women's Tax Resistance League which included George Bernard Shaw.

When tax resistance members had to have some of their goods auctioned to affray their dues, small processions from the auction house and celebrations took place with other supporters, with public speeches from decorated carriages, to explain their protest.

Despite a debate in the House of Lords where it was realised that the law was unfair, British law did not get amended until 1972.

Membership
Among the members or those who had to have their goods auctioned to pay overdue taxes, were as follows

 Janie Allan
Sarah Benett
Anne Cobden-Sanderson
Alice Davies
Charlotte Despard
Dr. Margaret Dobson
Louisa Matilda Fagan 
Mary Sargant Florence
Katharine Gatty
Cicely Hamilton 
Dr. Mabel Hardie
Beatrice Harraden
Kate Harvey
Kate Haslam 
Isabella Eliza Harrison 
Dr. Katherine Heaney 
Amy Hicks or Bull
Lilian Hicks
Clemence Housman
Edith How-Martyn
Emily Juson Kerr
Anna Martin
Agnes Edith Metcalfe
Dora Montefiore
Anna Munro 
Dorinda Neligan
Margaret Nevison
Margaret Kineton Parkes
Winifred Patch 
Louisa Thompson Price
 Ethel Ayres Purdie
Mary Russell, Duchess of Bedford
Princess Sophia Duleep Singh
 Flora Annie Steel
Elizabeth Wilks
Edith Zangwill 
 and Stanton Coit (a member of "the men's branch").

Others included:  Dr Garrett Anderson,  the Misses Collier, the Misses Dawes Thompson, Mrs. Hartley, Mrs Merivale Mayer, Mrs. Milligan, Miss Raleigh, Mrs. Vaughan and Miss Green, Mrs Bormann Wells.

Women's Tax Resistance in the United States
The women's suffrage movement in the United States came to adopt some of the same techniques. Anna Howard Shaw said "I hold it is unfair to the women of this country to have taxation without representation, and I have urged [members of the National Woman Suffrage Association] to adopt a course of passive resistance like the Quakers instead of aggressive resistance.  I say to the Government, 'you may pick my pocket because you are stronger than I, but I'm not going to turn my pockets wrongside out for you.' ... I believe that the spirit of 'no taxation without representation' that resulted in the Revolutionary War is inherent and just as actual in the women of the country as it was then in the men of the country."

Notes

Archives
The archives of the Women's Tax Resistance League are held at The Women's Library at London Metropolitan University, ref  2WTR

References
 Gross, David (ed.) We Won't Pay!: A Tax Resistance Reader  pp. 323–325
 Thornley, Helen "No Vote, No Tax! The Women’s Tax Resistance League from 1909 to 1918" in Contemporary Issues in Tax Research (4), 2021, pp. 7–48

External links
 The Tax Resistance League Part 1: Siege at St Leonards 1912
 The Tax Resistance League Part 2: Women's procession attacked by men, 1912
 "Women's suffrage movement: The story of Kate Harvey" The Independent 24 November 2005
 "Lives and Times" The Scotsman 4 February 2006 (Sophia Alexandra Duleep Singh)

Tax resistance in the United Kingdom
Feminist organisations in the United Kingdom
Women's suffrage in the United Kingdom
Organizations established in 1909
Organizations disestablished in 1918
1909 establishments in the United Kingdom
1918 disestablishments in the United Kingdom